The Macquarie Fault Zone is a major right lateral-moving transform fault along the seafloor of the south Pacific Ocean which runs from New Zealand southwestward to the Macquarie Triple Junction.  It is also the tectonic plate boundary between the Indo-Australian Plate to the northwest and the Pacific Plate to the southeast.

The Macquarie Fault Zone includes a component of convergence which increases as it approaches the South Island of New Zealand.  Many researchers conclude that the fault zone here is an incipient subduction zone, with oblique motion corresponding to the transition from lateral (strike-slip) motion.  In the area known as the Puysegur Trench, the Indo-Australian Plate appears to be starting to sink beneath the Pacific Plate, the reverse of what is occurring off of New Zealand's North Island (see Kermadec-Tonga Subduction Zone).

A major geographic feature which runs along the Macquarie Fault Zone is known as the Macquarie Ridge.  This ridge represents both the different relative heights of the abutting plates as well as the component of compression between the plates.  The namesake Macquarie Island, named after Lachlan Macquarie lies atop a segment of the Macquarie Ridge.

The Macquarie Fault Zone merges into the Alpine Fault which cuts across the continental crust of New Zealand's South Island.

References

 Transform and Subduction Tectonics Along the Macquarie Ridge, University of Texas

Zealandia
Seismic faults of New Zealand
Seismic faults of Australia
Macquarie Island
Plate tectonics
Underwater ridges of the Pacific Ocean